Walter Frederick Cave (17 September 1863 – 7 January 1939) was an English architect, active in the later nineteenth and early twentieth centuries, who worked firstly in the Arts and Crafts style, and latterly in the Classical Revival. In addition to architecture, Cave worked as a landscape gardener, interior designer, furniture maker and cricketer.

Biography
He was born in Clifton, Bristol, England the son of Sir Charles Daniel Cave, 1st Baronet and Edith Harriet Symonds.
Educated at Eton, Cave went on to study art at the Royal Academy Schools. He was then articled to Arthur Blomfield. In 1889 he set up a practice in London and joined the Art Workers' Guild. His most notable building is the former headquarters of Burberry, The Haymarket, in London (opened 1913). He also worked for Somerville College, Oxford. Cave was also a first-class cricketer, playing in four first-class matches in 1883, making one appearance for the South in the North v South fixture and three appearances for Gloucestershire. A right-handed batsman, he scored a total of 74 runs with a high score of 42.

Personal life
In 1892, he married Jessie Maria Cochrane. They had one child, Richard Walter Dundonald Cave (1901–1980).

References

External links
Images of an Arts and Crafts style, Bechstein upright piano designed by Walter Cave

1863 births
1939 deaths
Architects from Bristol
People educated at Eton College
Alumni of the Royal Academy Schools
English cricketers
North v South cricketers
Gloucestershire cricketers